Hamid II may refer to:
 Abdul Hamid II (1842–1918)
 Syarif Hamid II of Pontianak (1913–1978)

See also 
 Hamid (name)